Genesis Redux: Essays in the History and Philosophy of Artificial Life is a 2007 book edited by Jessica Riskin. It is a collection of essays about the history of the making of mechanicals in an attempt to emulate or recreate life.

Reception
Genesis Redux has been reviewed by the Annals of Science, Nature, The British Journal for the History of Science, and The American Historical Review.

References

2007 non-fiction books
American non-fiction books
Automata (mechanical)